is a former Japanese football player.

Playing career
Hiroshi Hatano played for MIO Biwako Kusatsu, Mitsubishi Mizushima, Kamatamare Sanuki from 2007 to 2014.

References

External links

1984 births
Living people
Tenri University alumni
Association football people from Kyoto Prefecture
Japanese footballers
J2 League players
Japan Football League players
MIO Biwako Shiga players
Mitsubishi Mizushima FC players
Kamatamare Sanuki players
Association football defenders